Santa Diabla (literally: Holy Devil,  English title: Broken Angel) is an American telenovela written by José Ignacio Valenzuela, and produced by United States-based television network Telemundo Studios, Miami. The story begins with Gaby Espino and Carlos Ponce starring as the protagonists, while Aarón Díaz and Ximena Duque star as the antagonists.

Telemundo aired the serial as part of its 2013–2014 season. On August 6, 2013, the network began  broadcasting Santa Diabla weeknights at 10pm/9c, replacing El Señor de los Cielos. As with most of its other telenovelas, the network broadcast English subtitles as closed captions on CC3.

Plot 
Santa Diabla is the story of Santa Martínez (Gaby Espino), a woman who seeks revenge for the murder of her husband Willy Delgado (Lincoln Palomeque). Santa's revenge includes marrying Humberto Cano (Carlos Ponce), a powerful attorney in Marrero. Humberto hired Willy Delgado to give piano lessons to Humberto's niece Daniela Milan (Ana Osorio) at the Cano family's home, until Bárbara Cano (Wanda D'Isidoro), Daniela's mother and Humberto's sister, accused Willy of harassment and attempted rape of her daughter. Blaming the Canos for the unjust death of her husband, Santa intends to destroy the Cano family, but as she tries to complete her mission, she meets and falls in love with Santiago Cano (Aarón Díaz), Humberto and Bárbara's brother. All the while Inés Robledo (Ximena Duque) who is a rich and evil woman uses her power and influence to try and keep Santiago and Santa apart because of her obsession with Santiago.

Cast

Starring 
 Gaby Espino as Amanda Brown / Santa Martínez - 
 Aarón Díaz as Santiago Cano - 
 Ximena Duque as Inés Robledo - 
 Carlos Ponce as Humberto Cano -

Recurring Cast 
 Frances Ondiviela as Victoria Coletti - 
 Roberto Mateos as Patricio Vidal - 
 Lincoln Palomeque as Willy Delgado - 
 Wanda D'Isidoro as Bárbara Cano - 
 Ezequiel Montalt as Jorge "George" Millan - 
 Lis Vega as Lisette Guerrero - 
 Zully Montero as Hortensia de Santana - 
 Fred Valle as Gaspar Cano - 
 Virna Flores as Paula Delgado - 
 Eduardo Orozco as Arturo Santana -
 Kenya Hijuelos as Lucy Medina - 
 Alberich Bormann as Iván Cano - 
 Raúl Izaguirre as Vicente Robledo - 
 Luis Caballero as Carlos Coletti -
 Gerardo Riverón as Padre Milton Reverte - 
 Gilda Haddock as Francisca Cano - 
 Beatriz Valdés as Begoña Flores - 
 María Requenel as Tránsito Carvajal - 
 Javier Valcárcel as Francisco "Pancho" Robledo - 
 Ana Osorio as Daniela Millan - 
 Jorge Eduardo García as Willy Delgado Jr. / Guillermo Cano -

Recurring 
 Christian de la Campa as Franco García Herrera / René Alonso -  
 Jeimy Osorio as Mara Lozano - 
 Pedro Telémaco as Lázaro Illianes - 
 Carlos Augusto Maldonado as Ulises Colleti -
 Maki Soler as Alicia Cano / La Diabla - 
 Gledys Ibarra as Elisa Lozano - 
 Evelin Santos as Gloria 
 José Ramón Blanch as Orlando / El Toro / Ricardo Hernández
 Emily Alvarado as Child Alicia Cano

Production 
Santa Diabla marks the return of Gaby Espino years after participating in Más Sabe el Diablo and Ojo Por Ojo. The telenovela also marks Carlos Ponce's and Ximena Duque’s first antagonist roles, and the Telemundo debut of Aarón Díaz who signed an exclusivity agreement with Telemundo in 2013. Carlos Ponce and Aarón Díaz composed both the lyrics and music of the theme song of Santa Diabla, and they also performed the theme song for the telenovela. Filming of the telenovela began in late May 2013, and ended in December 2013.

Awards and nominations

References

External links 
 

2013 American television series debuts
2014 American television series endings
American television series based on telenovelas
Spanish-language American telenovelas
Telemundo telenovelas
2013 telenovelas